The R259 road is a regional road in Ireland, located in County Donegal. It is a scenic route around the coast of The Rosses.

References

Regional roads in the Republic of Ireland
Roads in County Donegal